Jüri Välbe (26 February 1911 – 23 March 1964) was an Estonian footballer who played as a forward and made one appearance for the Estonia national team.

Career
Välbe earned his first and only cap for Estonia on 10 August 1934 in the Turaani Turniir against Hungary, which finished as a 2–2 draw in Tallinn.

Personal life
Välbe died on 23 March 1964 at the age of 53.

Career statistics

International

References

External links
 

1911 births
1964 deaths
People from Tõrva
Estonian footballers
Estonia international footballers
Association football forwards